John Halletis a British actor, probably best known for his role as Barney in the 1970s television drama Survivors.

Other TV credits include: Z-Cars, The Regiment as regular Pte Hodge, Oil Strike North, All Creatures Great and Small, Call Me Mister and the uncompleted Doctor Who serial Shada.

External links 
 

Year of birth missing (living people)
Living people
British male television actors